The year 1829 in science and technology involved some significant events, listed below.

Chemistry
 Isaac Holden produces a form of friction match.

Mathematics
 Peter Gustav Lejeune Dirichlet publishes a memoir giving the Dirichlet conditions, showing for which functions the convergence of the Fourier series holds; introducing Dirichlet's test for the convergence of series; the Dirichlet function as an example that not any function is integrable; and, in the proof of the theorem for the Fourier series, the Dirichlet kernel and Dirichlet integral. He also introduces a general modern concept for a function.
 Nikolai Ivanovich Lobachevsky publishes his work on hyperbolic non-Euclidean geometry.
 S. D. Poisson publishes Sur l'attraction des sphéroides.

Medicine
 Dr Benjamin Guy Babington makes the first known use of a laryngoscope.

Palaeontology
 Jules Desnoyers names the Quaternary period.
 Engis 2, part of the skull of a young child and other bones, recognised in 1936 as the first known Neanderthal fossil, is found in the Awirs cave near Engis in the United Kingdom of the Netherlands (modern-day Belgium) by Philippe-Charles Schmerling.

Technology
 May – Cyrill Demian patents a version of the accordion in Vienna.
 June 30 – Henry Robinson Palmer files a British patent application for corrugated iron for use in buildings.
 July 23 – In the United States, William Burt obtains the first patent for a form of typewriter, the typographer.
 October 6–14 – The Rainhill Trials, a steam locomotive competition, are run in England and won by Stephenson's Rocket.
 December 19 – Charles Wheatstone patents the concertina in Britain.
 Louis Braille publishes the first description of his method of embossed printing that allows the visually impaired to read.

Higher Education
 Chalmers University of Technology founded in Gothenburg, Sweden.
 Technical University of Denmark (originally named 'College of Advanced Technology') founded in Copenhagen, Denmark.
 University of Stuttgart founded in Stuttgart, Germany.
 Ecole Centrale Paris (originally named 'École Centrale des Arts et Manufactures') founded in Paris, France.

Awards
 Copley Medal: not awarded

Births
 February 2
 Alfred Brehm (died 1884), German zoologist.
 William Stanley (died 1909), English inventor.
 March 23 – N. R. Pogson (died 1891 in science), English-born astronomer.
 April 28 – Charles Bourseul (died 1912), Belgian-born telegraph engineer.
 April 30 – Ferdinand von Hochstetter (died 1884), German-born geologist.
 August 13 (O.S. August 1) – Ivan Sechenov (died 1905), "the father of Russian physiology".
 August 23 – Moritz Cantor (died 1920), German historian of mathematics.
 August 24 - Emanuella Carlbeck (died 1901), Swedish pioneer in the education of students with intellectual disability.
 September 7 – August Kekulé (died 1896), German chemist.
 September 30
 Franz Reuleaux (died 1905), German mechanical engineer.
 Joseph Wolstenholme (died 1891), English mathematician.
 October 15 - Asaph Hall (died 1907), American astronomer.
 November 4 - Hanna Hammarström (died 1909), Swedish inventor.

Deaths
 March 1 – Thomas Earnshaw (born 1749), English watchmaker.
 April 6 – Niels Henrik Abel (born 1802), Norwegian mathematician.
 May 10 – Thomas Young (born 1773), English physicist.
 May 29 – Humphry Davy (born 1778), English chemist.
 June 29 – James Smithson (born 1764), English mineralogist, chemist and benefactor.
 November 14 – Louis Nicolas Vauquelin (born 1763), French chemist.
 October 10 – Maria Elizabetha Jacson (born 1755), English botanist.
 December 28 – Jean-Baptiste Lamarck (born 1744), French naturalist.
 undated - Huang Lü, Chinese scientist.

References

 
19th century in science
1820s in science